Fernando Ruiz may refer to:

Fernando Ruiz de Castro (died 1377), Galician nobleman and military figure
 (fl. c. 1500–1536), Spanish writer
 (1505–1575), Spanish nobleman and mayordomo mayor
Fernando Ruiz de Castro Andrade y Portugal (1548–1601), Spanish nobleman and viceroy of Naples
Fernando Vargas Ruiz de Somocurcio (1918–2003), Peruvian bishop
 (1925–2003), Chilean bishop
, Argentine footballer
Fernando Ruiz (born 1996), Mexican footballer

See also
Fernando Ruiz de Castro (disambiguation)